Cabo Rojo National Wildlife Refuge (Spanish: Refugio Nacional de Vida Silvestre de Cabo Rojo) is an 1,836-acre National Wildlife Refuge located in southwestern Puerto Rico, in the municipality of Cabo Rojo. The refuge is a habitat for number of native bird species including the endangered yellow-shouldered blackbird, locally known as mariquita de Puerto Rico or capitán. Many birds find their way to the refuge while migrating between North and South America, and more than 118 bird species have been recorded near the area.

The Cabo Rojo National Wildlife Refuge is administered as part of the Caribbean Islands National Wildlife complex.

History 
The refuge was established in 1974, when 587 acres of land were obtained by the U.S. Fish and Wildlife Service from the Central Intelligence Agency which had operated the Caribbean Bureau of the Foreign Broadcast Information Service there for a number of years. 

In 1999, the FWS purchased and added to the refuge the Cabo Rojo Salt Flats, a historic salt mining site located near the Los Morrillos Lighthouse. This site dates to 700 C.E. and is considered one of the oldest industries in the Americas. Caborrojeños Pro Salud y Ambiente, a local civic group, runs a visitor center in the salt flats area.

Features 
The Cabo Rojo National Wildlife Refuge was established to protect the rolling hills, grasslands, mangroves and subtropical dry forests of Cabo Rojo. Due to decades of overgrazing, much of the native vegetation has been replaced by plants from other regions. Invasive species like the grasses that feed cattle are considered undesirable because they compete with the native vegetation, reducing diversity and therefore decreasing optimal food and nesting habitat for the native wildlife. Grassland management, through haying, has allowed native grasses to grow back and provide a better home for the native fauna. Additionally, native trees are being planted to return the land to its original mature hardwood forest.

Special designations 
The Cabo Rojo National Wildlife Refuge has been designated a Critical Habitat for the yellow-shouldered blackbird (Agelaius xanthomus), and the Cabo Rojo Salt Flats are recognized as an Important Critical Wildlife site within the refuge. The refuge has also been declared a BirdLife International Important Bird Area (under the name Suroeste de Puerto Rico) and was the first Caribbean site to be added to the Western Hemisphere Shorebird Reserve Network (WHSRN).

Wildlife 
Cabo Rojo National Refuge is home to 245 plant species and 145 bird species, including shore and land birds. Some of the bird species found in the refuge include the American kestrel (Falco sparverius), the smooth-billed ani (Crotophaga ani), the black-necked stilt (Himantopus mexicanus), the yellow or mangrove warbler (Setophaga petechia), the Adelaide's warbler (Setophaga adelaidae), the troupial (Icterus icterus) which was introduced from Venezuela, the semipalmated plover (Charadrius semipalmatus), the Wilson's plover (Charadrius wilsonia) and the Puerto Rican woodpecker (Melanerpes portoricensis).

The refuge is also home to a large number of endemic reptiles and amphibians such as the Puerto Rican red-eyed frog (Eleutherodactylus antillensis), the Cuban tree frog (Osteopilus septentrionalis) and the white-lipped frog (Leptodactylus albilabris). Native plants found in the refuge include the cobana negra (Stahlia monosperma), the pipe-organ cactus (Cephalocerus royenii), the West Indian birch (Bursera simaruba) and the guayacan (Guaiacum officinale).

Adjacent protected areas 
The Cabo Rojo National Wildlife Refuge is located close to the Laguna Cartagena National Wildlife Refuge, both of which are administered as part of the Caribbean Islands National Wildlife complex. The national wildlife refuge is also adjacent to different units belonging to the Boquerón State Forest, which protects the mangrove forests that stretch from Cabo Rojo to Lajas, and the Cabo Rojo National Natural Landmark.

Gallery

See also 

 List of National Wildlife Refuges of the United States
 List of protected areas of Puerto Rico
 United States Fish and Wildlife Service

References

External links 
 Cabo Rojo National Wildlife Refuge
 Cabo Rojo Salt Flats Unit
 N.W.R at the recreation.gov

Cabo Rojo, Puerto Rico
National Wildlife Refuges in Puerto Rico
1974 establishments in Puerto Rico
Protected areas established in 1974